Charles Smith  was  an English Anglican priest in the 17th century.

Smith was a Fellow of The Queen's College, Oxford. He held the living at  St Mary, Sompting and St Martin, Ludgate in the City of London. He was a Canon of st Paul's Cathedral. He was  Archdeacon of Colchester from 1675 until his death in 1680.

Notes

1680 deaths
17th-century English people
Fellows of The Queen's College, Oxford
Archdeacons of Colchester